Eugenio Anthony DePasquale (born August 3, 1971) is an American Democratic politician who served as the Pennsylvania Auditor General from 2013 to 2021. From 2007 to 2013, he served in the Pennsylvania House of Representatives, representing the York County-based 95th district. He was the Democratic nominee for Pennsylvania's 10th congressional district in the 2020 election. Since leaving office, DePasquale has joined the faculty at Widener University School of Law as an Adjunct Professor.

Early life and education
A native of Pittsburgh, Pennsylvania, DePasquale graduated from Central Catholic High School and received a bachelor's degree from the College of Wooster.  He later earned an MPP from the University of Pittsburgh and a JD from Widener University Commonwealth Law School.

DePasquale is the grandson of Eugene "Jeep" DePasquale, who served in the Pittsburgh City Council between 1971 and 1989.

Early career
DePasquale moved to York in 1997. He served as director of economic development for the City of York in the early 2000s.

From 2003 to 2006, DePasquale served as deputy secretary for community revitalization and local government support of the Pennsylvania Department of Environmental Protection.

Political career

Pennsylvania House of Representatives 
When incumbent state representative Steve Stetler resigned from his seat and withdrew from the ballot during the 2006 elections, DePasquale announced his intent to replace him. The York County Democratic Party selected him as their replacement nominee in August, and he defeated Republican nominee Karen Emenheiser 58.3% to 41.7%. His legislative district included all of the city of York, Spring Garden Township, part of West Manchester Township, and the boroughs of North York and West York.

DePasquale was re-elected in 2008, defeating Republican candidate Lon Emenheiser 75.1% to 24.9%. In 2010, DePasquale was unopposed both in his primary and general re-election bids.

Pennsylvania Auditor General

2012 campaign

In April 2011, DePasquale announced that he would be running for State Auditor General in 2012 to succeed incumbent Jack Wagner, who was term-limited. DePasquale made Marcellus shale drilling a central issue of his campaign, and promised to order an immediate performance audit of the Department of Environmental Protection to ensure the state's water supply had not been compromised by drilling. He defeated Republican state representative John Maher in the fall general election. Both Maher and DePasquale were concurrently re-elected without opposition to their seats in the state house.

DePasquale resigned his seat in the state house on January 15, 2013, and was sworn-in as auditor general later that day. He became the first person from York County to assume statewide elected office since George Leader was elected governor in 1954.

2016 campaign 

In the 2016 election, DePasquale was reelected auditor general with 50% of the vote, defeating Republican John Brown.

Tenure 

In July 2014, DePasquale announced results of an audit of the Department of Environmental Protection's (DEP) water programs related to the development of the state's shale gas reserves. Results of that audit showed the DEP had been unprepared to effectively administer laws and regulations to protect drinking water and unable to efficiently respond to citizen complaints in the period 2009-2012. The report cited sloppy record-keeping, lax oversight, and poor communication with citizens.

A September 2016 report from the Auditor General's office revealed that over 3,000 rape kits were backlogged by local law enforcement agencies, awaiting testing, with 60% of them waiting untested for over a year. A followup in May 2020 announced that the untested backlog had been reduced by 97%, due to increased financial support from the state budget, outside groups and federal programs.

In the wake of the Pittsburgh synagogue shooting, the Auditor General's office released a report in November 2018 on the subject of gun safety in Pennsylvania and access to guns by those requiring mental health care, calling for greater monitoring by gun sellers of buyers in emotional distress. DePasquale's office likewise audited the Pennsylvania background-check system for possible gaps and errors in its screenings for ineligible purchasers.

Along with Pennsylvania Governor Tom Wolf, DePasquale co-chaired a School Safety Task Force that gathered feedback about safety concerns, drills and security measures to prevent or mitigate school shootings.

In February 2019, DePasquale announced that officials in 18 Pennsylvania counties had disclosed that they had accepted improper (but not illegal) gifts from voting-machine vendors, and that several additional officials had failed to disclose such gifts. This followed an investigation about the security of voter registration data, prompted by election-security concerns originating in the 2016 election.

2020 U.S. House of Representatives candidacy 

Term-limited from running again as Auditor General, DePasquale announced in June 2019 his candidacy for the United States House of Representatives to represent Pennsylvania's 10th congressional district. He won the Democratic nomination on June 3, 2020. DePasquale was defeated in the general election, with incumbent Scott Perry being declared the victor on November 5. DePasquale subsequently conceded the race.

Electoral history

References

External links

Auditor General Eugene DePasquale government website
Eugene DePasquale for Congress campaign website

|-

|-

1971 births
21st-century American politicians
College of Wooster alumni
Living people
Democratic Party members of the Pennsylvania House of Representatives
Pennsylvania Auditors General
University of Pittsburgh alumni
Widener University Commonwealth Law School alumni